Sumrall can refer to:

 Sumrall, Mississippi
 Allison Sumrall, voice actress
 Lester Sumrall, television evangelist